Far East Blues Experience is a compilation album of Gugun Power Trio a.k.a. Gugun Blues Shelter. The album was released by Grooveyard Records in early month of January 2011. The album was the first release under Grooveyard Records, and the first release too for the band under name Gugun Power Trio.

Track listing
All song written and composed by Gugun Power Trio a.k.a. Gugun Blues Shelter.

Personnel
 Gugun - Lead Guitar and Lead Vocals
 Jono Armstrong - Bass guitar
 Bowie - Drums
 Ardi - bass # 1-6)
 Agung - drums # 1-6)
 Iskandar - drums # 7-9)

References

External links 
 Official Site

2011 albums
Gugun Blues Shelter albums